Pierre O'Connell (1900-1973) was a French film producer.

Selected filmography
 The Prosecutor Hallers (1930)
 La Route imperial (1935)
 The Czar's Courier (1936)
 Behind the Façade (1939)
 They Were Twelve Women (1940)
 Father Goriot (1945)
 Patrie (1946)
 Panic (Panique) (1947)
 Marianne of My Youth (1955)
 Mademoiselle and Her Gang (1957)

References

Bibliography
 Phillips, Alastair. City of Darkness, City of Light: Émigré Filmmakers in Paris, 1929-1939. Amsterdam University Press, 2004.

External links

1900 births
1973 deaths
French film producers